On Earth to Make the Numbers Up is the debut album by the English indie pop band Fosca. It was released on October 2, 2000.

Track listing

 "The Agony Without the Ecstasy" - 2:55
 "It's Going to End in Tears (All I Know)" - 5:57
 "The Millionaire of Your Own Hair" - 6:01
 "Storytelling Johnny" - 6:01
 "Assume Nothing" - 6:04
 "Live Deliberately" - 5:01
 "On Earth to Make the Numbers Up" - 6:55
 "There Is Another Country" - 5:50

Personnel
Dickon Edwards (Guitar, Lead Vocals)
Rachel Stevenson (Keyboards, Vocals)
Alex Sharkey (Guitar, Keyboards, Vocals)
Sheila B (Cello)

2000 debut albums
Fosca albums